The 1903 Academy of Idaho Bantams football team represented the Academy of Idaho—now known as Idaho State University–as an independent during the 1903 college football season. Led by second-year head coach Herbert Cheney, the Bantams compiled a record of 0–1–1.

Schedule

References

Academy of Idaho
Idaho State Bengals football seasons
College football winless seasons
Academy of Idaho Bantams football